Brevibacillus brevis (formerly known as Bacillus brevis) is a Gram-positive, aerobic, motile, spore-forming, rod-shaped bacterium commonly found in soil, air, water, and decaying matter. It is rarely associated with infectious diseases. The antibiotics gramicidin and tyrocidine were first isolated from it.

Brevibacillus brevis is catalase positive, amylase negative, casein negative, gelatinase positive, and indole negative;  most strains are citrate users. Some strains are capable of oxidizing carbon monoxide aerobically. Optimal growth occurs at 35 °C to 55 °C.

References

Paenibacillaceae
Bacteria described in 1900